This is a list of amateur radio transceivers.

Alinco

Land 
 DJ-100
 DJ-A10/A40
 DJ-A11/A41
 DJ-A35
 DJ-A36
 DJ-A446
 DJ-CRX series
 DJ-VX10/50
 DJ-VX11 series
 DJ-W10
 DJ-W18
 DJ-W35
 DJ-W58
 DJ-W100
 DR-138/438
 DR-CS10

Baofeng 
RX and TX below and elsewhere are ham radio jargon for receive and transmit.

UV-5R 

The Baofeng UV-5R is a hand-held radio that has been marketed illegally in the United States and was produced since 2012. It has been used in a number of projects involving radios. It is described as a popular inexpensive model.

Features 
The UV-5R is designed to transmit on the 2 meter band between 136 and 174 MHz and on the 70 cm band between 400 and 520 MHz. Features include CTCSS and duplex operation for use with local repeaters, dual watch and dual reception, an LED flashlight, voice prompts in either English or Chinese and programmable LED lighting for the LCD display.

Illegal marketing and distribution in the United States 
The FCC cited the Houston, Texas based importer Amcrest Industries which owns and operates Baofeng radio US for illegally marketing UV-5R, "capable of operating outside the scope of its equipment authorization,” the FCC Citation said, which is outside of its Part 90 authorization granted. The FCC asserts Amcrest marketed "UV-5R-series FM hand-held radios capable of transmitting on “restricted frequencies." "Marketing a device that is "capable of operating outside the scope of its equipment authorization,” is not allowed.

CRT France 

Communication Radio Telecommunication France is a company producing amateur radio transceivers.

Icom

Handheld 
 ID-51
 ID-31 (DSTAR)
 ID-52 (DSTAR)
 IC-2AT (ANALOG)
 IC-F4GS (ANALOG UHF)
 IC-T70A (ANALOG DUAL BAND)
 IC-T90A (ANALOG TRI-BAND)
 IC-V80 (ANALOG)
 IC-V86 (ANALOG)

HF 
 IC-7800
 IC-7851
 IC-7700
 IC-7610
 IC-7600
 IC-7300
 IC-7200
 IC-703
 IC-718
 IC-728

HF/VHF/UHF All Mode 
 IC-9100
 IC-7000
 IC-7100
 IC-705

VHF/UHF All Mode 
 IC-9700

Kenwood 

Among the product lines are the "TS" series of HF transceivers which cover the HF ("high frequency") bands, from 1.8 to 50 MHz. These transceivers include the TS-820S, the TS-590S, the TS-850S, the TS-430S.

Other series include the 100, 500, and the 2000 series.  Kenwood also offers a "B" model, which is a transceiver without display or controls and is completely controlled by a remote computer or a separate control unit.

 Radios with built-in digital data modes and modems (for APRS)

HF HF/VHF/UHF

TS-2000 

The Kenwood TS-2000 is an amateur radio transceiver manufactured by the Kenwood Corporation. Introduced in the year 2000, the radio was known for its "all-in-one" functionality. It can transmit on all amateur radio bands between 160 meters and 70 centimeters, with the exception of the 1.25 meters and 33 centimeters bands, and the "X" model also has built-in 23 centimeters band capability option. Kenwood discontinued production of the TS-2000 in September, 2018.

Variations 
 TS-2000, the standard base station model, with the regional versions
 K-Type for the Americas;
 E-Type for Europe;
 E2-Type for Spain;
 TS-2000X, same as the above with the addition 1.2 GHz (23 cm band) capability;
 TS-B2000, a sleek "black box" unit requiring a computer or an optional mobile control panel for control
 TS-2000LE, limited production TS-2000 with a black finish to celebrate Kenwood's 60th Anniversary

Features 
The TS-2000 was marketed as a feature-rich transceiver. As an "all-band" transceiver, the TS-2000 offers a maximum power output of 100 watts on the HF, 6 meters, and 2 meters bands, 50 watts on 70 centimeters, and, with the TS-2000X or the optional UT-20, 10 watts on the 1.2 GHz or 23 centimeters band.  The (American version) radio's main receiver covers 30 kHz through 60 MHz, 142 MHz through 152 MHz, and 420 through 450 MHz (plus 1240 through 1300 MHz with the "X" model).  The sub-receiver tunes between 118 and 174 MHz, and from 220 to 512 MHz (VFO ranges).

The radio's main receiver uses DSP at the IF level, so a very flexible selection of bandwidths are available without the purchase of mechanical filters, as was necessary on past radios.

It features backlit keys, a built-in TNC for receiving DX Packet Cluster information, and the Sky Command II+ system (found on the K-Model), which allows for remote control of the transceiver using Kenwood's TH-D7A handheld or TM-D700A mobile radio.

Firmware 
Kenwood provides a firmware Update, Memory Control Program MCP-2000, and Radio Control Program ARCP-2000.

TS-820S 

The Kenwood TS-820S is a model of amateur radio transceiver produced primarily by the Kenwood Corporation from the late 1970s into the 1980s; some were produced by Trio Electronics before Kenwood's 1986 name change). The transceiver's predecessor was the TS-520, which began production a year earlier. The TS-820S was the second of three hybrid (including vacuum tubes and semiconductors) models produced by Kenwood during the 1970s and 1980s, and was noted for its quality. Its functionality and new hybrid technology made it one of the most popular transceivers marketed to amateurs in the late 1970s and early 1980s. The TS-820S has a built-in power supply, so it can be plugged directly into a 120 V wall outlet.

Variants 

The TS-820 did not have an LED frequency counter, but was otherwise identical to the 820S. The TS-820S was the most sophisticated (and common) variant. The TS-820X, unavailable in the United States, was primarily produced in Japan.

Functions 
The transceiver can transmit and receive on the HF 10-, 15-, 20-, 40-, 80- and 160-meter bands, and can receive WWV and WWVH on 15 MHz. It can use SSB, FSK and CW on all bands. The TS-820S' power consumption is 57 watts (with heaters on) when receiving and 292 watts when transmitting. The transceiver's peak envelope power output on SSB and CW is about 100 watts, and about 60 watts on FSK. Its tubes are tuned manually, using the transceiver's drive, plate and load controls.

General specifications 

 Frequency range: 1.8–2.0 MHz, 3.5–4.0 MHz, 7.0–7.3 MHz, 14.0–14.35 MHz, 21.0–21.45 MHz, 28.0–28.5 MHz, 28.5–29.0 MHz, 29.0–29.5 MHz, 29.5–29.7 MHz; receives WWV and WWVH on 15 MHz
 Power supply: 120/220 VAC
 Modes (receive and transmit): LSB, USB, FSK, CW
 Power consumption: 57 watts (receive, heaters on); 292 watts (transmit)
 Antenna impedance: 50–75 ohms
 Antenna Connector: SO-239
 Weight: 
 Dimensions: Width , height , depth 
 Features: Digital frequency counter, VOX, noise blanker, receiver incremental tuning (RIT), IF shift, RF attenuation

Receiver and transmitter specifications 

 Stability: Within 100 Hz in 30 minutes after the radio has warmed up, or up to 1 kHz in one hour after one minute of warm-up.
 Audio-frequency response: 400–2600 Hz within 6 dB 
 Bandwidth: 2.4 kHz on SSB, 500 Hz on CW

Midland

Handheld 
 CT590 S (Analog VHF/UHF)
 CT990 EB (Analog VHF/UHF)

Mobile 
 CT 2000 (Analog VHF/UHF)
 CT 3000 (Analog VHF/UHF)
 DBR 2500 (Analog VHF/UHF)

Wouxun 

Quanzhou Wouxun Electronics Co. Ltd. is a manufacturer of hand held radios from Quanzhou City, Peoples Republic of China.

The company was founded in 2000 to manufacture UHF/VHF radios. The motto of the company is "Quality first,customer supreme" and Qouxoun is meeting the ISO 9001-Norm for a quality management.

 KG-UV6D
 KG-UV9D

Yaesu 

{| 
|- valign="top"
|

FT-221 
The FT-221 is a modular VHF 2M all mode (SSB, AM, CW and FM) amateur radio transceiver, produced during the 1970s.

Technical description 
 Frequency Range 144.0 MHz ~ 148.0 MHz
 Emission: AM FM SSB (LSB and USB) and CW
 Power Output:
 SSB 12 Watts PEP
 FM, CW 14 Watts
 AM 2.5 Watts

Other model variants 
The FT221R is a model with repeater shift. The FT221RD also has a digital display.

FT-857 

The Yaesu FT-857 is one of the smallest MF/HF/VHF/UHF multimode general-coverage amateur radio transceivers. The set is built by the Japanese Vertex Standard Corporation and is sold under the Yaesu brand.
 The FT-857 is developed on the FT-897 and MARK-V FT-1000MP transceivers.

Technical specifications
RX Freq coverage: 100 kHz-56 MHz, 118 MHz-164 MHz, 420 MHz-470 MHz
TX Freq coverage: 160 – 6 Meters, 2 Meters, 70 Centimeters
Emission: CW, SSB, AM, FM, Digital mode
Power output: 100W (SSB,CW,FM), 25W (AM, carrier) @ 13.8V

QRP Transceivers 

These are low power transceivers primarily used by Amateur Radio Operators for QRP (low power) Operation. They are available as commercial products, built from kits or homebrewed from published plans.

See also 
 List of amateur radio software
 List of communications receivers

References

Amateur radio transceivers
Amateur radio-related lists